The 1970 Victorian state election was held on 30 May 1970.

Retiring Members

Labor
Bill Divers MLA (Footscray)
Leo Fennessy MLA (Brunswick East)
Charlie Ring MLA (Preston)
Clive Stoneham MLA (Midlands)
Keith Sutton MLA (Albert Park)
Samuel Merrifield MLC (Doutta Galla)
Archie Todd MLC (Melbourne West)

Liberal
Sir John Bloomfield MLA (Malvern)
Tom Darcy MLA (Polwarth)
Murray Porter MLA (Sandringham)
Geoffrey Thom MLC (South Western)

Country
Leslie Cochrane MLA (Gippsland West)
Sir Herbert Hyland MLA (Gippsland South)

Legislative Assembly
Sitting members are shown in bold text. Successful candidates are highlighted in the relevant colour. Where there is possible confusion, an asterisk (*) is also used.

Legislative Council
Sitting members are shown in bold text. Successful candidates are highlighted in the relevant colour. Where there is possible confusion, an asterisk (*) is also used.

References

Psephos - Adam Carr's Election Archive

Victoria
Candidates for Victorian state elections